STARTALK is a language education program at the University of Maryland, created under the National Security Language Initiative, a federal program which seeks to expand the teaching of strategically important languages in the United States. Languages taught under the STARTALK program include Arabic, Chinese, Dari, Hindi, Persian, Portuguese, Russian, Swahili, Turkish, and Urdu. STARTALK is a project of the National Foreign Language Center of the University of Maryland, located in Riverdale, Maryland.

See also
Language Resource Center
Governor's Foreign Language Academies

References

Language education in the United States
Language education organizations
United States educational programs
University of Maryland, College Park